Brent Daniels (born 9 March 1999) is a professional Australian rules footballer playing for the Greater Western Sydney Giants in the Australian Football League (AFL). He made his debut in round 16 of the 2018 season against the West Coast Eagles at Perth Stadium.

Daniels grew up in Swan Hill and played junior football for Nyah-Nyah West United. He boarded at Geelong Grammar School with fellow footballers and friends Paddy Dow, Lochie O'Brien and Jarrod Brander. Daniels played cricket and football for the school teams. He also played football for the Bendigo Pioneers in the TAC Cup and for Vic Country in the AFL Under 18 Championships. Daniels missed the second half of the 2016 season with a knee injury. He tested at the 2017 AFL Draft Combine and recorded the third-best time of 8.11 seconds in the agility test. Callum Twomey commented that Daniels's "mix of agility, endurance and pace ... stand out." He was drafted by the GWS Giants with pick 27 in the 2017 national draft, but suffered a meniscus tear in December which was expected to sideline him for ten to twelve weeks. He spent a month in the North East Australian Football League before his round 16 debut. Coach Leon Cameron said "He’s got great tackle pressure, chase pressure and we like that ... he can hit the scoreboard, he’s a very good front and square player". In the 2019 AFL Semi Final against the Brisbane Lions, Daniels kicked the match winning goal in the dying minutes of the game to give Greater Western Sydney a spot in the Preliminary Final against Collingwood. For the 2019 season Daniels was the 2nd shortest player in the AFL.

References

External links 
 
 

Living people
1999 births
People from Swan Hill
Bendigo Pioneers players
Greater Western Sydney Giants players
Australian rules footballers from Victoria (Australia)